Armandia may refer to:
 Armandia (polychaete), a genus of polychaetes in the family Opheliidae
 Armandia, a genus of flatworms in the family Lacistorhynchidae, synonym of Grillotia
 Armandia, a genus of gastropods in the family Camaenidae, synonym of Armandiella